Sprudge is an American blog founded by Zachary Carlsen and Jordan Michelman and based in Portland, Oregon, focusing on "coffee news and gossip".

Founded in 2009, Sprudge is the flagship blog of the Sprudge Media Network. The Sprudge Media Network manages sister sites Sprudge Live and Sprudge Wire. In its first three months of existence, the website was called "The Sprudge Report" and a direct visual parody of the Drudge Report.

Sprudge came under scrutiny after publishing the name of an anonymous author of a blog titled "The Bitter Barista", resulting in the termination of the author's job.

In 2013, Jordan Michelman and Zachary Carlsen received the Distinguished Author Award from the Specialty Coffee Association of America.

The Sprudge Media Network was recognized as a 2017 Webby Award Honoree in the Cultural Blog/Website category.

In 2018, Michelman and Carlsen co-wrote The New Rules of Coffee: A Modern Guide For Everyone, an illustrated guide to coffee published by Ten Speed Press, a division of Penguin Random House.

Sprudge teamed up with South by Southwest to curate the Roasters Village, an extension of the 2018 SouthBites Trailer Park food program at the festival.

References

External links

Sprudge Official Website

Coffee culture
American blogs
 
Internet properties established in 2009
Companies based in Portland, Oregon